Yayla is a Turkic name given to settlements or areas which are suitable for summer mountain resorts and summer highland transhumance. The term is also cognate with the related Turkic term yaylak. Since in Oghuz languages the last -k or -ı(g) sounds generally drop as in examples such as yazı(g), dizi(g), dolu(g), ölü(g), with the last letter dropped as yayla (opposing to yaylak or yaylag), it is only in use in Turkish and other closely related languages such as Crimean Tatar, Gagauz, Balkan Turkish and Azerbaijani.

Etymology 

Since the antiquity, Turks used to call their transhumance locations by different names depending on the season.  Yazlak (for spring), yaylak (for summer), güzlek (for autumn) and kışlak (for winter) referred to transhumance and pasture locations of different seasons of the year. But out of the four, yayla and kışla (with the last letter dropped)  are more widespread. Kışla (from kış meaning winter) refers to relatively warmer places in the plains and yayla (from yay meaning summer) refers to mountain slopes where the pasturing is easier during the summer (see Alpine meadow).

Traditional yayla as resort 

While it is also considered as attractive summer resorts for people of both rural and urban areas, yayla (either Turkic yaylak or Alpine transhumance) is mainly a part of the economy of farmers and ranchers who are generally dwellers of rural settlements (such as villages, districts, small towns). In summers, Mediterranean coasts and the regions affected by are known to be hotter than other areas of Turkey, thus people of Mediterranean and Aegean geographical regions generally seek cooler yaylaks traditionally, instead of Western-promoted beach culture. However, new generations who born and raised in the Western-promoted lifestyle of urban culture generally prefer beach tourism over yayla culture. Because of deteriorating economical situation in rural areas because of rapidly developing industrialization and growing global effect of capitalism, majority of the population of rural areas had to migrate to the urban areas (e.g. industrial metropolitan cities such as Istanbul, Bursa, Antalya, Adana), also town dwellers had to migrate to bigger towns and cities. Estimates show that in 1930s, rural population made up the 75% of Turkish population whereas contemporary official estimates show that the situation now is the exact opposite, the urban population makes up the 75% of Turkish population. Hence, these rural or tribal-originated families who now dwell in the cities, annually migrate back to their villages or yaylas in summers or even springs. 

Yaylas, like all other transhumance locations, are generally temporary settlements. However it is known that Turks historically transformed their yayla lands into their permanent homeland (e.g. Kozanoglu tribe), so that makes the temporary status of yaylaks and other seasonal locations controversial since in Alpine and Turkic transhumance culture every season has different permanent houses.

Contemporary yayla culture 
 

In the second half of the 20th century, after Western lifestyle (which was highly capitalism-oriented after 1950s, creditably) was promoted by generally the American-headquartered companies (culturally such as Disney, Hollywood, and in varying areas such as McDonald's, Coca-Cola, Nike etc.) as “modern lifestyle”, the yayla practice is not as popular as it once used to be. Since the contemporary popular culture diverted people to prefer beach tourism over yaylas via mostly televised advertisements on the contemporary technology (such as air conditioning, highways to the touristic areas etc.) which arguably softens hotter summers. However, the Turkish people of tribal background (such as Yörüks, Manavs, Varsaks, Turcomans, and other Anatolian Oghuz Turkic tribes), who make up a significant portion of Turkish population, are more prone to preserve the traditional Turkic lifestyle and still spend their summer in the rarely-populated cooler highlands or yaylas, instead of hot beaches. Because of its continuing and still growing summer fame as attractive settlements among both rural and urban populations and also among generations born and raised in the urban culture, despite the successful promotion of relatively newly-introduced Western lifestyle, the yaylas became bigger and urbanized over years, creating a new urban identity for some of popular yaylas converting from their previous rural identities (e.g. Akçatekir, Uzungöl).

Gallery

See also 
 List of yaylas in Turkey

References

Hill and mountain resorts
Resorts in Turkey
Turkish words and phrases